Sonny Moonsammy (born 2 June 1935) is a Guyanese cricketer. He played in two first-class matches for British Guiana in 1958/59.

See also
 List of Guyanese representative cricketers

References

External links
 

1935 births
Living people
Guyanese cricketers
Guyana cricketers